Hilario "Junjun" Perez Davide III (born August 25, 1964) is a Filipino politician and lawyer who is the incumbent vice governor of Cebu. He served as a governor of Cebu Province from 2013 to 2019. He is the son of former Chief Justice Hilario Davide Jr.

Early life
Born in Cebu City on August 25, 1964, to former Supreme Court Chief Justice Hilario Davide Jr. and Virginia J. Perez-Davide, both public servants.

Educational background
Junjun finished elementary at the Sacred Heart School for Boys in 1977 and completed high school at the University of the Philippines in the Visayas – Cebu campus in 1981. He then took up Bachelor of Arts in political science at University of the Philippines – Diliman, Quezon City where he graduated in 1991. In 1995, he obtained a Bachelor of Laws degree at the University of San Carlos.

Political life

Councilor of Cebu
Davide served as councilor of Cebu City from 2004 to 2010.

Governor (2013 - 2019)
Leading their opponents by more than 160,000 votes, lawyer Hilario Davide III and Acting Governor Agnes Magpale were proclaimed governor and vice governor on May 13, 2013.

The final and official count showed Davide with 654,054 votes, while Representative Pablo John Garcia got 490,148.

Davide led by 163,906, three years after he lost his first gubernatorial campaign to the then re-electionist Governor Gwendolyn Garcia by more than 96,000 votes.

Vice Governor (2019 - present) 
After serving two terms as Governor of Cebu Province, Junjun Davide bid for Vice Governor under the Liberal Party / Nationalist People's Coalition (NPC) alliance whose official Governor candidate is Agnes Magpale. Magpale lost to Gwen Garcia of PDP-Laban / One Cebu.

Junjun Davide won against Daphne Salimbagon. In honor of the partnership established with Magpale and the BAKUD party of northern Cebu, Davide takes oath as Vice Governor before former Vice Governor Magpale.

To ensure peace and continuous development to Cebu province, the former Governor now Vice Governor Davide turns over 27 sets of capitol documents to then governor-elect Gwendolyn Garcia in a formal turn-over in June 2019. Despite coming from different political groups, Vice Governor Davide vows to support Governor Garcia's agenda for Cebu.

Website
Hilario Davide III's Facebook account

References 

1964 births
Living people
Governors of Cebu
Liberal Party (Philippines) politicians
University of the Philippines Diliman alumni
Filipino city and municipal councilors
20th-century Filipino lawyers
People from Cebu City
Cebuano people
University of San Carlos alumni
Vice Governors of Cebu